Jason Thomas Sanders (born November 16, 1995) is an American football kicker for the Miami Dolphins of the National Football League (NFL). He played college football at New Mexico.

Early years
Sanders attended and played high school football at Villa Park High School.

College career
Sanders attended and played college football at New Mexico from 2014–2017. In his collegiate career, he converted 111-of-112 extra point attempts and 25-of-35 field goal attempts, with a career-long of 53 yards.

Out of college, he was touted as the top pro kicking prospect in the country by renowned kicking coach Brent Grablachoff of Kicking World.

Collegiate statistics

Professional career

2018 
Sanders was drafted by the Miami Dolphins in the seventh round, 229th overall, of the 2018 NFL Draft.  He was one of two kickers to be drafted that year. He was named the Dolphins starting kicker following the release of undrafted rookie Greg Joseph. He made his NFL debut in the season opener against the Tennessee Titans. He converted all three field goal attempts and both extra point attempts in the 27–20 victory. In Week 6, against the Chicago Bears, he converted the game-winning field goal in overtime. In 16 games, Sanders made 18 of 20 field goals on the year, and this 90-percent field goal conversion rate was the fifth best in team history. He also converted 35 of 36 extra point attempts. After his first season, Sanders was named to the Pro Football Writers of America 2018 all-rookie team.

2019 
In Week 10 of the 2019 season, Sanders converted all three field goals and an extra point, accounting for 10 points in a 16-12 win over the Indianapolis Colts, earning himself AFC Special Teams Player of the Week. In their Week 13 game against the Philadelphia Eagles, Sanders, despite being a kicker, recorded his first career receiving touchdown when he caught a one-yard touchdown pass from punter Matt Haack in the 37–31 win. The play marked the NFL's first touchdown pass to a kicker since October 16, 1977. Sanders won the AFC Special Teams Player of the Week award for his performance. In Week 14, against the New York Jets, Sanders converted on a franchise-record seven of eight field goal attempts in the 22–21 loss. He was also named AFC Special Teams Player of the Month for his performance in December. He finished the 2019 season with 29 of 30 extra point attempts converted and 23 of 30 field goal attempts converted.

2020 
In Week 5 of the 2020 season against the San Francisco 49ers, Sanders was a perfect 5 for 5 on field goal attempts and 4 for 4 on extra point attempts, scoring a total of 19 points, during the 43–17 win, earning AFC Special Teams Player of the Week honors for his performance. He also earned AFC Special Teams Player of the Month for October after converting all 11 field goal attempts and all seven extra point attempts for the month. He missed his first kick of the year in Week 10 against the Los Angeles Chargers. He was the last perfect kicker in the NFL.
Sanders was named the AFC Special Teams Player of the Month for his performance in November. In Week 16, Sanders converted both extra point attempts and went 4-for-4 on field goals, including a 44-yard game winner in a 26–25 win over the Las Vegas Raiders, earning AFC Special Teams Player of the Week. After the 2020 season, he tied with Daniel Carlson and Younghoe Koo for the scoring title. He also received First-team All-Pro honors. In the 2020 season, he made 36 of 39 field goals and also made all 36 extra point attempts.

2021 
On February 16, 2021, Sanders signed a five-year, $22 million contract extension with the Dolphins, making him one of the highest paid kickers in the NFL. In Week 10 during a prime-time game against the Baltimore Ravens, Sanders hit 3 of 3 field goal attempts and made his only extra point attempt in the 22-10 win.
During Week 18 against the New England Patriots, Sanders converted his two field goal attempts and all three extra point attempts in the 33-24 win. Overall, in the 2021 season, he made 23 of 31 field goals and 34 of 35 extra point attempts.

2022
In Week 2, against the Baltimore Ravens, Sanders converted a career-high six extra point attempts in the 42–38 victory.

References

External links
New Mexico Lobos bio
Miami Dolphins bio

1995 births
Living people
Sportspeople from Orange, California
Players of American football from California
American football placekickers
New Mexico Lobos football players
Miami Dolphins players